Clubul Sportiv Orășenesc Tricolorul Breaza, commonly known as Tricolorul Breaza, is a Romanian football club based in Breaza, Prahova County and currently playing in the Liga IV – Prahova County, the fourth tier of the Romanian football league system. 

The club was founded in 1971 and disbanded in August 2010 when it merged with Liga V team Navobi Iași to form ACSMU Politehnica Iași. In order to continue the football legacy of Breaza, in June 2010, was founded Precizia Breaza, which was enrolled in Liga V Prahova County, the fifth tier. In 2013 Precizia ceded the place in Liga IV  to the newly formed multi-sport club CSO Tricolorul Breaza.

History 
Football in Breaza appeared after the First World War, the press of that time writing the story of a match played 1924 in the commune from Prahova Valley between “Tricolorul I” from Breaza and “Principesa Ileana I” from Câmpina. The current club was founded in 1971, Tricolorul played for thirty years in the Prahova County Championships. Between 1982 and 1993 the club was called Precizia Breaza and between 1993 and 2001 Hidrojet, after the name of the factory that sponsored the club.

Hidrojet promoted to Liga III at the end of the 2000–01 season, winning the Liga IV – Prahova County and the promotion play-off played against Aromet Poșta Câlnau, the winner of Liga IV – Buzău County 2–0 at Tractorul Stadium in Brașov. The lineup of Hidrojet with Ilie Rontea as head coach: Florin Panfil – Ionuț Nicolae (63 Puiu Buciu), Gabriel Bâcneanu (68 Bogdan Cazan), Bogdan Iarca, Antonio Moțoi – Alexandru Chilom, Constantin Rontea (cpt), Cosmin Costache, Paul Enache – Florin Defta, Marian Uțică (82 Marius Vișan).

After promotion to Liga III, the club changed its name to Tricolorul Breaza. In the first season in the Third Division was assigned to Series II, ending the season in 9th position. Followed six seasons in the Third Division in which Tricolorul finished as follows: 4th (2002–03), 9th (2003–04), 5th (2004–05), 2nd (2005–06), 11th (2006–07) and 3rd (2007–08). Also, Tricolorul reached the Round of 32 of the 2007–08 Cupa României losing 0–1 to Gloria Buzău.

Tricolorul, with Florin Stăncioiu as head coach, finished the 2008–09 season as runners-up in the 3rd Series of Liga III and promoted to Liga II after won the promotion play-offs against Oțelul Galați II and CSO Ovidiu. The squad included the following players: Bogdan Sava, Marius Anghelache, Andrei Stoica, Samson Nwabueze, Rareș Forika, Ionuț Petcu, Cristian Apostol, Mihai Olteanu, Daniel Șandru, Radu Bumbăr, Marian Băeșu, Bogdan Marinescu, Valentin Turiac, Georgian Ghiță, Marius Dascălu, Alin Liuba, Marius Vișan, Andrei Vasilescu, Marian Ghiorghiță. In Cupa României, Tricolorul reached, for the second time in a row, the Round of 32, but lost 1–2 to Oțelul Galați.

In the 2009–10 season, Tricolorul Breaza debuted in the Second Division, but despite a good start in which it accumulated 9 points from their first five matches, the team led by Florin Stăncioiu finished 16th out of 18 in the Series I being spared from relegation due to the withdrawal of FC Baia Mare from Liga II.

In the summer of 2010, after the bankruptcy of the original Politehnica Iași, the owner Constantin Anghelache moved Tricolorul Breaza to Iași and merged with Liga V team Navobi Iași to formed ACSMU Politehnica Iași, leaving the Breaza town without a football team. In order to continue the football legacy of Breaza, in June 2010, was founded Precizia Breaza, which was enrolled in Liga V – Prahova County, the fifth tier of the Romanian football league system.

In the 2010–11 season, Precizia, with Cornel Vasilescu as head coach, played in the West Series of the fifth division and finished in seventh place. The next season saw Precizia promoted to Fourth Division after won the West Series of Liga V - Prahova County.

Honours 
Liga III
Runners-up (2): 2005–06, 2008–09
Liga IV – Prahova County
Winners (1): 2000–01
Runners-up (2): 1976–77, 2019–20
Liga V – Prahova County
Winners (1): 2011–12

Current squad

Club officials

Board of directors

Current technical staff

References

External links
 

Football clubs in Prahova County
Association football clubs established in 1971
Liga II clubs
Liga III clubs
Liga IV clubs
1971 establishments in Romania